Luffa operculata (common name, sponge cucumber, wild loofa or mướp xơ in Vietnamese) is a species of Luffa. It is cultivated for its fruit, which when fully ripe is strongly fibrous and is used as a fibrous scrubbing sponge for household cleaning. The fruit is a capsule with spikes. The fruit is dark-brown when mature. It is also grown in gardens and yards as an ornamental plant. In colder places they can be grown indoors as a houseplant.

The species name is derived from the word, operculum, meaning "little lid."  When the fruits are mature, and the seeds are ready to be dispersed, a small part of the bottom tip (blossom end) opens up.  Then, the seeds fall to the ground.

Luffa is used as an herbal remedy, with some pharmacological activity found in animal tests and insufficient data proving effectiveness in humans. Its use in homeopathy is diluted many times, with insufficient material to produce any effect, and not approved by any official United States government regulatory agencies.

References

External links
 Luffa operculata Picture
 Luffa operculata mature Picture

Cucurbitoideae